The Minnesota Senate is the upper house of the Legislature of the U.S. state of Minnesota. At 67 members, half as many as the Minnesota House of Representatives, it is the largest upper house of any U.S. state legislature. Floor sessions are held in the west wing of the State Capitol in Saint Paul. Committee hearings, as well as offices for senators and staff, are located north of the State Capitol in the Minnesota Senate Building. Each member of the Minnesota Senate represents approximately 80,000 constituents.

History
The Minnesota Senate held its first regular session on December 2, 1857.

Powers
In addition to its legislative powers, certain appointments by the governor are subject to the Senate's advice and consent. As state law provides for hundreds of executive appointments, the vast majority of appointees serve without being confirmed by the Senate; only in rare instances are appointees rejected by the body. The Senate has rejected only nine executive appointments since 2000.

Elections
Each Senate district is split between an A and B House district (e.g., Senate District 41 contains House districts 41A and 41B). The Minnesota Constitution forbids a House district to be within more than one Senate district.

In order to account for decennial redistricting, members run for one two-year term and two four-year terms each decade. Senators are elected for four-year terms in years ending in 2 and 6, and for two-year terms in years ending in 0. Districts are redrawn after the decennial United States Census in time for the primary and general elections in years ending in 2. The most recent election was held on November 8, 2022.

Leadership
From statehood through 1972, the lieutenant governor served as president of the Senate. In 1972, voters approved a constitutional amendment that provided for the Senate to elect its own president beginning January 1973. The president, who presides over official Senate proceedings, also acts as the parliamentarian and oversees the secretary of the senate.
The majority leader is responsible for managing and scheduling the business of the Senate and oversees partisan and nonpartisan staff. The current majority leader is Kari Dziedzic, a Democrat from Minneapolis. The current minority leader is Mark Johnson, a Republican from East Grand Forks. Each caucus also selects its own leaders and deputy leaders.

Minnesota Senate Building 
Committee hearings primarily take place in the Minnesota Senate Building, a 293,000 square feet office building that opened in January 2016. The $90 million office building, which is located north of the State Capitol across University Avenue includes three committee hearing rooms, offices for all senators and staff, a raised terrace overlooking the State Capitol, and a 264-space underground parking facility.

The 2016 session was held in the newly-constructed Minnesota Senate Building due to an extensive restoration at the State Capitol. It was the first time the Senate held a regular session outside of the State Capitol since its opening in 1905.

Composition

Historical composition

Current composition 
93rd Minnesota Legislature (2023–2025)

Members, 2023-2027

See also
 Minnesota House of Representatives
 Minnesota Legislature
 Past composition of the Senate
 Political party strength in Minnesota

Notes

References

External links
 Official website

Senate
State upper houses in the United States